"Stand Inside Your Love" is a song by American alternative rock band the Smashing Pumpkins. It was the second single and the lead international single released from their fifth album, Machina/The Machines of God (2000). The song was written by Billy Corgan.

Content 
Billy Corgan claims the song is written about his then-girlfriend Yelena Yemchuk. He explained, "'Stand Inside Your Love' is one of those rare songs that seems to write itself really quickly... As far as the song goes, it's sort of a love song that rocks, which is pretty rare, even for me. And I even got my girlfriend dancing in the video, so it's all a tribute to my girlfriend, I guess." Corgan would also call it the only "true" love song he's ever written.

"Stand Inside Your Love" was initially conceived to be similar to the new wave style of the band's earlier hit "1979"; however, Corgan opted for what he considered "the classic Pumpkins sound".

The single contains one B-side, "Speed Kills", which appears in a shortened form on the vinyl and import CD versions of Machina, and in a heavier incarnation on the band's following album Machina II/The Friends & Enemies of Modern Music.

The single cover of "Stand Inside Your Love" was designed by Vasily Kafanov and is primarily a depiction of the alchemical androgyne, one of the most significant symbolic representations within alchemy, and, on its most basic level, represents the perfect union between man and woman when joined as a single entity. Atop their head is a single crown, known to the Kabbalists as Kether, the source of all creation, and the first Sephiroth on the Tree of Life.

Music video 
The music video of "Stand Inside Your Love" is a tribute to the 1891 play Salomé by Oscar Wilde. Billy Corgan created the video's look together with English director W.I.Z. under the heavy influence of original Salomé illustrations by Aubrey Beardsley. The nipple-rubbing fat man sitting on the throne is played by Ken Davitian, better known for his role as Azamat Bagatov in the movie Borat. Corgan's then-girlfriend Yelena Yemchuk played the main character in the video.

Sharon Osbourne cited her dislike for the music video, along with her conflicts with Corgan, as a motive for her departure from the band's management. The music video won the Most Visionary Video award at the 2000 VH1 Fashion Awards.

Release 
While "The Everlasting Gaze" was the lead single in the United States from Machina, with a radio promotional single released, and a high-energy music video filmed with new band member Melissa Auf der Maur, "Stand Inside Your Love" was ultimately released as the lead international single. It remains their last commercially successful single internationally.

Track listing

Charts

References

External links
 

1999 songs
2000 singles
The Smashing Pumpkins songs
Songs written by Billy Corgan
Song recordings produced by Flood (producer)
Song recordings produced by Billy Corgan
Virgin Records singles
Dream pop songs